Anna Clark may refer to:

Anna Clark (model) (born 1966), American model
Anna Clark (historian) (born 1974), ancient historian
Anna Clark (actress) (fl. 1911), actress; see The Fishermaid of Ballydavid

See also
Anne Clark (disambiguation)